General elections were held in Malaysia on Wednesday, 9 May 2018. At stake were all 222 seats in the Dewan Rakyat, the lower house of parliament. The 13th Parliament was dissolved by Prime Minister Najib Razak on 7 April 2018. It would have been automatically dissolved on 24 June 2018, five years after the first meeting of the first session of the 13th Parliament of Malaysia on 24 June 2013.

In an unprecedented victory, the Pakatan Harapan (PH) coalition, which had been the country's federal opposition prior to the elections, won a majority in the Dewan Rakyat together with the Sabah Heritage Party (WARISAN), with PH and WARISAN together winning 121 seats. The elections marked the first time in Malaysia's history that the ruling party was voted out of power. The Barisan Nasional (BN) coalition had previously enjoyed an uninterrupted reign over the country since Malaya's independence in 1957, but this came to an end following the elections. PH's leader, Mahathir Mohamad, who previously served as Malaysia's Prime Minister from 1981 to 2003, was sworn in for the second time on 10 May, a day after the elections. At 93 years of age, Mahathir was also the world's oldest elected head of government. Barisan Nasional (BN), led by Najib, held onto 79 seats and became the new federal opposition, along with Gagasan Sejahtera (GS), which won 18 seats. The United Sabah Alliance (USA) won one seat, while three seats were won by independent politicians. The elections were widely regarded as one of the greatest political upsets worldwide in 2018.

In the simultaneous state elections held for 12 of the state legislative assemblies, PH retained Penang and Selangor with larger majorities, while gaining Negeri Sembilan, Malacca, Johor, Kedah and Perak from BN. WARISAN also seized Sabah from BN, which retained only two states – Perlis and Pahang. GS held onto Kelantan while gaining Terengganu from BN. State-level elections were not held in Sarawak, as the state had held its elections separately in 2016. However, as a consequence of the elections, Sarawak-based BN component parties left the coalition to form Gabungan Parti Sarawak (GPS), thereby taking over the state from BN.

Following the elections, Mahathir secured a royal pardon for the jailed PH leader, Anwar Ibrahim, and indicated that he would give way to the latter within the next few years. Meanwhile, Najib resigned as BN's chairman on 12 May and was succeeded as Leader of the Opposition by his party colleague, Ahmad Zahid Hamidi. Investigations within Malaysia into the 1Malaysia Development Berhad (1MDB) scandal, which had been halted during Najib's tenure, were resumed in the aftermath of the elections, resulting in several ongoing criminal indictments against the former Prime Minister. However, PH only ruled for 22 months before being replaced by a new Government named Perikatan Nasional, a coalition led by Muhyiddin Yassin after BERSATU left the Pakatan Harapan coalition together with ex-PKR members to join with Barisan Nasional (BN), Pan-Malaysian Islamic Party (PAS) and Gabungan Parti Sarawak (GPS) and again replaced back to Barisan Nasional led by Ismail Sabri Yaakob 17 months later.

Background 

In the previous general elections in 2013, the incumbent Barisan Nasional government was re-elected for the thirteenth consecutive time, but with a decreased mandate and losing the majority vote. Barisan Nasional chairman, Najib Razak, was re-elected as Prime Minister to a second term. The main opposition, Pakatan Rakyat, led by Anwar Ibrahim, won the majority vote but was unable to win enough seats to form the government due to Malaysia's first-past-the-post voting system and alleged gerrymandering. The elections marked the first time Barisan Nasional lost the majority vote in the party's history.

Electoral system 
Elections in Malaysia exists at two levels: the federal level and the state level. Federal elections are held to elect members of the Dewan Rakyat, the lower house of Parliament, while state elections are held to elect members of the 13 State Legislative Assemblies of Malaysia. The heads of executive branch at both the federal and state levels, the Prime Minister and Menteri Besar/Chief Ministers respectively, are indirectly elected, usually filled by a member of the majority party/coalition in the respective legislatures

The Dewan Rakyat is made up of 222 members of parliament, elected for a five-year term; these seats are distributed between the thirteen Malaysian states in proportion to the states' voting population. Members are elected from single-member constituencies that each elects one representative to the Dewan Rakyat using the first-past-the-post voting system. If one party obtains a majority of seats, then that party is entitled to form the Government, with its leader as Prime Minister. If the election results in no single party having a majority, there is a hung parliament. In this case, the options for forming the Government are either a minority government or a coalition. Malaysia does not practice compulsory voting and automatic voter registration. The voting age is above 21 although the age of majority in the country is 18.

The redistribution of electoral boundaries for the entire country had been presented to and passed by the Dewan Rakyat, and subsequently gazetted on 29 March 2018 after obtaining the royal consent of the Yang di-Pertuan Agong ahead of the 14th general election. Elections are conducted by the Election Commission of Malaysia (EC), which is under the jurisdiction of the Prime Minister's Department.

Date and cost
The Constitution of Malaysia requires a general election to be held at the end of five (5) years from the date of the first Parliament of Malaysia proceeding after a general election unless it is dissolved earlier by the Yang di-Pertuan Agong due to a motion of no-confidence or at the request of the Prime Minister. Whenever Parliament (Dewan Rakyat) is dissolved, a general election shall be held within sixty (60) days from the date of the dissolution and Parliament shall be summoned to meet on a date not later than one hundred and twenty (120) days from that date (Article 55 of the Constitution of Malaysia).

Timetable 
The key dates are listed below in Malaysia Standard Time (GMT+8):

Cost 
The cost to the taxpayer of organising the election was RM500 million – RM100 million more than the previous general election.

Part of the spending was spent on indelible ink, which costed around RM4.8 million for a total of 100,000 bottles of 60mL ink imported from Mysore Paints and Varnish Limited in India.

Election spending 
Before the campaign, there were no limits to what a political party, candidate, or third party (corporations, unions, special interest groups, etc.) can spend: Spending rules are only in force after the writs have been dropped and the campaign has begun. Malaysian election law set election spending limit at RM200,000 for each parliamentary candidate and half of the latter for each state legislature candidate.

Dissolution of state legislative assemblies 
While any state may dissolve its assembly independently of the Federal Parliament, the traditional practice is for most state assemblies to be dissolved at the same time as Parliament. In accordance with Malaysian law, the parliament as well as the legislative assemblies of each state (Dewan Undangan Negeri) would automatically dissolve on the fifth anniversary of the first sitting, and elections must be held within sixty days of the dissolution, unless dissolved prior to that date by their respective Heads of State on the advice of their Heads of Government.

Below are the dates of which the legislative assembly of each state dissolved:

The Sarawak State Legislative Assembly was not dissolved as the last elections were held in 2016 and the term of the state assembly is due to end in 2021.

Parties and leaders 
Altogether 53 parties were eligible to contest in the elections and get on the ballot and can therefore elect a representative in the Dewan Rakyat. Furthermore, there are several independent candidates running in single-member constituencies.

The leader of the party commanding a majority of support in the Dewan Rakyat is the person who is called on by the Yang di-Pertuan Agong to form a government as Prime Minister, while the leader of the largest party not in government becomes the Leader of the Opposition.

The table below lists parties which were represented in the 13th Dewan Rakyat.

Last election pendulum 
The previous General Election witnessed 133 governmental seats and 89 non-governmental seats filled the Dewan Rakyat. The government side had 44 safe seats and 34 fairly safe seats, while theopposition had 33 safe seats and 18 fairly safe seats.

Opinion polls 

Note also that in the 2013 general election, the current component parties of Pakatan Harapan and Gagasan Sejahtera were competing together under an informal coalition, Pakatan Rakyat. In 2015, disagreements between those component parties over the Malaysian Islamic Party (PAS) and their desire to implement hudud law prompted a split, with PAS leaving to form the Gagasan Sejahtera coalition. The remaining parties in Pakatan Rakyat, together with PAS splinter party Amanah and former Prime Minister Mahathir Mohamad's PPBM, formed the Pakatan Harapan coalition. Hence, while Pakatan Rakyat won the popular vote in 2013, the component parties forming Pakatan Harapan did not.

Notes
  - Survey presented findings of Peninsular Malaysia respondents only.
  - Survey presented findings of Selangor respondents only

Politicians not standing

Members of Parliament not standing for re-election

Endorsements 

Newspapers, organisations and individuals endorsed parties or individual candidates for the election.

Conduct
There had been many controversies even before the general election began, mostly regarding gerrymandering and the electoral boundary re-delineation in favour of the Barisan Nasional coalition. The body regulating elections in Malaysia, the Election Commission of Malaysia (which is under the control of the Prime Minister's Department), was criticised by election watchdogs, including Bersih, the Human Rights Commission of Malaysia and various other organisations for electoral malpractices, arbitrary decisions and a lack of transparency.

Gerrymandering 
Opposition parties, non-governmental organisations and even politicians from the ruling party accused the government of gerrymandering, manipulating the composition of electoral seats in favour of Barisan Nasional. The opposition claims that the manipulation primarily involves merging opposition-dominated areas into large, single seats and dividing BN-favouring areas among several, smaller seats so as to favour rural voters who are more inclined to support the ruling party. An analyst with electoral reform group Tindak Malaysia estimates that this latest redelineation process would allow Barisan Nasional to regain control with just 33% of the vote.

The Electoral Integrity Project (EIP), an independent academic project based at Harvard University and the University of Sydney that studies election integrity and assigns PEI scores (Global Perceptions of Electoral Integrity) to countries across the world, had in its most recent research paper published in November 2017, ranked Malaysia's election integrity at 142nd out of 158 countries, just above Zimbabwe (143th), Vietnam (147th) and Afghanistan (150th).

Polling day on midweek 
Many Malaysians protested the Election Commission's decision to set the Polling Day on midweek (Wednesday, 9 May) rather than to set it on a weekend (i.e. Saturday) as it had been in the previous General Elections. Some of them, including Pakatan Harapan chairman Mahathir Mohamad, PAS deputy president Tuan Ibrahim Tuan Man and Bersih chairperson Maria Chin, viewed such a decision to be unfair, undemocratic, and an attempt to discourage people overseas or interstate from returning to their hometowns to vote. In response, Najib Razak declared Wednesday a national holiday.

Overseas ballot issues 
Since the 2013 elections, overseas voting has been open to the majority of Malaysian registered voters living abroad. However, registered overseas Malaysian voters were reported to have received their ballots late, some even on election day, despite the election commission requiring their ballots to be returned before the close of polling stations to be counted as valid. As a result, many of these overseas voters organised on social media to bring theirs and other ballots back through casual couriers. The Election Commission of Malaysia currently denies trying to stop overseas Malaysians to vote.

Nomination Day controversies 
Controversies erupted after six candidates for the opposition coalition, Pakatan Harapan, were disqualified from running under suspicious circumstances on Nomination Day (Saturday 28 April 2018). The most prominent disqualification was that of PKR vice-president Chua Tian Chang, who the local returning officer prevented from defending his Batu parliamentary seat due to an earlier court conviction, despite a High Court judgement which made clear he was eligible to continue as an MP. A subsequent High Court appeal was thrown out, under the claim that they did not have jurisdiction over election-related matters. Chua and his party are consequently endorsing independent candidate, 22-year-old P. Prabakaran, for the seat.

Meanwhile, in Rantau, Negeri Sembilan, the state's Chief Minister Mohamad Hasan was re-elected unopposed after opposition candidate Dr. Streram Sinnasamy was prevented from entering the nomination centre, ostensibly as he did not have an entry pass, despite his claim that he was never issued one and despite the fact that there are no laws requiring candidates to have entry passes. Four other opposition candidates were barred for being undischarged bankrupts, despite claims that earlier checks with the authorities had confirmed their ability to participate.

Lawyers and other political analysts criticised these returning officers for a "gross abuse of power" that went beyond their primary role (to assist with filing nomination papers) and deprived several candidates of the chance to exercise their democratic right. They claim that incidents like this contribute to the perception that Malaysian elections are inherently unfair and weaken the rule of law. Pakatan Harapan chairman Mahathir Mohamad confirmed that he would appeal these decisions to the courts, alleging an "abuse of power" by "officers who are willing to do illegal things on orders".

Alleged vote-buying 
The ruling coalition, Barisan Nasional, faced criticism for alleged vote-buying. The Nikkei Asian Review noted that measures like cash bonuses being handed out to civil servants and pensioners, key components of its support base, occurred just before the dissolution of the lower house of Parliament, with other measures announced during the campaign trail including "special aid" of RM500 (US$127) and reserved social housing units for employees of government-linked company DRB-HICOM as well as minimum wage increases.

Within constituencies, Barisan Nasional MPs came under significant criticism from electoral watchdog Bersih, with seven out of ten individuals named in their "Election Offenses Hall of Shame" being from Barisan Nasional component parties. Musa Aman, Noh Omar, Hamzah Zainudin and Shahanim Mohd Yusuf (BN-UMNO) as well as P. Kamalanathan and Jaspal Singh (BN-MIC) were publicly reprimanded for handing out free food, petrol, furniture, groceries and motorcycles in their respective constituencies, in what was widely seen as an attempt to sway the vote in favour of them.

Controversy also erupted over Barisan Nasional's battle for the Sekinchan constituency, considered a marginal seat held by opposition party DAP, where an election event organised by Datuk Seri Jamal Yunos (the UMNO chief for Sungai Besar) in support of local candidate Lee Yee Yuan (BN-MCA) included an all-you-can-eat buffet, chances to win a motorcycle and a RM25,000 (US$6,345) cash prize, as well as a promise of a RM2,000 (US$508) payment for every voter if they are elected. All payments, along with a claimed RM150,000 in donations and a Mercedes-Benz C200 to be offered at the next event, were claimed to have been donated by "successful businessmen" in the small fishing village (population: 20,000) who wanted to show their "gratitude" to BN. While Yunos denies any wrongdoing, claiming that he is not a candidate but is "only conveying contributions from certain individuals," the Sekinchan DAP branch lodged a police report against him for alleged vote-buying.

Yunos also faced controversy for being caught on video handing out RM50 (US$13) notes from a bag at a function in the Sungai Leman Bendang Utara village, which is also part of Sekinchan. He claimed that those being paid were "party workers" responsible for "putting up flags, buntings and other materials," a claim that media were unable to independently verify. Media outlet Malaysiakini noted that most of those being paid were not dressed in Barisan Nasional colours, and that significant numbers of senior citizens and children were present at the event.

The main opposition alliance, Pakatan Harapan, was also not immune to allegations of vote-buying. Pakatan Harapan's manifesto, particularly, lists as a key promise the abolition of Malaysia's 6% GST and increasing minimum wages, which journalists and financial analysts claim amounts to pork-barrel populism that could negatively affect Malaysian government finances. Bersih also included Afif Bahardin (PH-PKR) on their Election Offenses Hall of Shame for utilising Penang state government programmes to give handouts such as hampers to voters in his constituency of Seberang Jaya.

Additionally, Ahmad Yakob, the Menteri Besar of Kelantan, was singled out for criticism after "repeatedly using Kelantan state government resources" to benefit the campaign of his party, PAS (competing as the main component of the Gagasan Sejahtera coalition), including by handing out cash to religious leaders in a state government hall covered in PAS flags.

Release of results 
On polling night, the announcement of results took longer than usual, as it was alleged that the Election Commission officers were delaying their signing of Form 14 for announcing the results. This was later revealed in an interview between Mahathir and The Mekong Review, where he revealed that there were attempts to get winning PH candidates to cross over to BN and PAS, fearing that PH "were not going to respect the position of Islam as much as the previous government had". He added that they had already won as early as 8.30 pm but did not receive the official announcement until 2 AM.

Election observers 
The Election Commission (EC) invited 14 countries to participate in the polls as foreign observers, comprising representatives of election management bodies from the Association of Southeast Asian Nations (ASEAN), Commonwealth of Nations, Asian and European countries as well as a study and support centre for the Malaysian Commonwealth Studies Centre based in Cambridge, United Kingdom. Seven countries agreed to send representatives to observe the elections, namely Azerbaijan, Cambodia, Indonesia, Kyrgyzstan, Maldives, Thailand and Timor-Leste. The invitation was also extended to India, Pakistan and Uzbekistan of which nine countries observers arrived on 7 May. The EC also appointed 1,236 election observers from 14 local non-governmental organisations.

Results

The nationwide counting of votes began at 17:00 on 9 May. The decision to close the polling stations at 17:00 was met with protests by disgruntled would-be voters who contended that, given the longer-than-usual queues, the Election Commission (EC) could have extended the polling hours, as had been done in the previous elections.

The first unofficial result came from the constituency of Baram in Sarawak, which was won by Barisan Nasional (BN). Despite BN's early lead, by 20:30, Pakatan Harapan (PH) and BN were almost neck and neck. The states of Sarawak and Sabah, long regarded as BN's "fixed deposits", witnessed a significant swing in favour of PH and the Sabah Heritage Party (WARISAN) respectively. In a further blow to BN's chances, several leaders of BN's component parties, such as Subramaniam Sathasivam (MIC), Liow Tiong Lai (MCA) and Mah Siew Keong (Gerakan), were defeated in their respective constituencies by PH candidates. Mahathir Mohamad, PH's Prime Ministerial candidate, secured the constituency of Langkawi by 21:45. As the night wore on, it was reported that PH also retained the states of Penang and Selangor with larger majorities.

Stunned by the rapidly deteriorating turn of events, federal authorities attempted to stymie the release of unofficial election results. At 21:13, the Malaysian Communications and Multimedia Commission (MCMC) ordered Internet Service Providers (ISPs) to block Malaysiakini and its sister websites, which were providing live updates of the poll counting, on the grounds that the updates "may affect national stability, public order and harmony, and economic stability". Meanwhile, unmarked cars, allegedly carrying fake ballot boxes, were spotted entering some of the counting stations. Enraged onlookers tried to stop the cars, leading to sporadic rioting. The most serious rioting occurred in the town of Ayer Hitam in Johor; the rioters in the town were eventually dispersed by the Royal Malaysia Police's Federal Reserve Unit (FRU).

At about 23:20, Mahathir claimed during a press conference at the Sheraton Hotel in Petaling Jaya that PH had already exceeded the simple majority of 112 seats needed to form the federal government. He added that PH had successfully wrested the states of Negeri Sembilan, Malacca, Johor and Kedah from BN. However, Mahathir alleged that some EC officers were refusing to sign Form 14 in their respective constituencies, which is required for the results to be announced. He further warned that although "Malaysians are not violent people, they should not take this lying down".

Following the press conference, the EC started releasing the official election results just after midnight. However, the official results were continuously delayed and announced only gradually, as the counting of votes was said to be still ongoing in several places. At about 02:30, right after unofficial results had confirmed PH's simple majority, Mahathir, flanked by several PH leaders, gave another press conference, announcing that the Istana Negara (National Palace) had summoned the leader of the People's Justice Party (PKR) - the party whose logo was used by PH in the polls - and that he would be sworn in as the nation's seventh Prime Minister later that day.

Tellingly, BN's victory celebrations at Kuala Lumpur's Putra World Trade Centre, which had been customary in the event of a BN electoral victory, did not materialise. Instead, BN's top echelons held a closed door meeting at the private residence of the outgoing Prime Minister and BN chief, Najib Razak. This sparked fears that the defeated incumbent government would resort to martial law to cling to federal power. When informed of the coalition's impending defeat, a distraught Najib asked "do people really hate me that much?", while another BN politician told the press after the meeting that "whatever it is, we need to respect the will of the people". In any event, martial law was never touched upon in the meeting.

The EC announced the full official election results shortly before 05:00, where it was revealed that the states of Sabah and Perak were left with hung legislative assemblies. Meanwhile, the Gagasan Sejahtera (GS) coalition, led by the Malaysian Islamic Party (PAS), was not only able to retain Kelantan, it also captured the state of Terengganu from BN. Najib finally conceded defeat during a press conference at 11:00.

By state

Seats that changed allegiance

Aftermath 
Pakatan's victory triggered nationwide celebrations, marking the end of a 61-year rule by Barisan Nasional (and preceding Alliance Party). Mahathir Mohamad was sworn in as the Prime Minister on the night of 10 May at the Istana Negara by Yang di Pertuan Agong Muhammad V, triggering more nationwide celebrations.

Defections and state government formations 
The general election resulted in a hung parliament in the 60-seat Sabah State Legislative Assembly, after Barisan Nasional and the Warisan-Pakatan pact both won 29 seats in the election. This made the Homeland Solidarity Party (STAR) as the 'kingmakers', as the party won two state seats, giving them the power to give either bloc the mandate to form the state government. Considering that STAR is an opposition party, it was wildly expected for them to support a Warisan-led government. However, the party's leadership chose to support a Barisan government instead, sparking mass protests across the state by opposition supporters. As such, Barisan Nasional, with the support of STAR, formed the next Sabah state government, with Musa Aman chosen as Chief Minister. However, the formation of government didn't last long after one of Barisan's component parties, the United Pasokmomogun Kadazandusun Murut Organisation (now United Progressive Kinabalu Organisation; UPKO), which won five state seats, withdrew from the coalition and announced support for a Warisan-led government in Sabah. Warisan president, Shafie Apdal, was later sworn in as the new Sabah Chief Minister the day after. On the same day, another Sabah-based Barisan Nasional component party, the Liberal Democratic Party (LDP), also announced their withdrawal from the coalition, citing their poor performance in the election, losing in every constituency they contested in.

The day afterwards, another two Sabah-based Barisan Nasional component party, the United Sabah People's Party (PBRS) and the United Sabah Party (PBS), also announced that they had left Barisan. PBRS stated that they would seek an alliance with Pakatan Harapan and would apply for membership in the ruling party coalition, while PBS stated that they are seeking to form a new Sabah-based coalition, compromising of all Sabah Opposition parties. In 2020, after vowing for new coalitions, made for all Sabah-based parties, the Gabungan Rakyat Sabah (GRS) finally created to take over Shafie's WARISAN+ government, having secure simple majority under Hajiji Noor, former Sabah UMNO member.

Meanwhile, the general election also resulted in a hung parliament in the 59-seat Perak State Legislative Assembly, in which Pakatan won 29 seats, two short of a majority, while Barisan and the Pan-Malaysian Islamic Party (PAS) each won 27 and 3 seats. This would mean neither of the three parties would have enough seats to form the Perak state government. PAS proposed the formation of a unity government compromising of all sides in the State Legislative Assembly, but was rejected by Pakatan. However, Pakatan succeeded in forming the state government after two Barisan assemblymen announced their support for Pakatan to form the state government, thus ending the hung parliament status-quo. Their action resulted in the two assemblymen having their UMNO membership dropped, meaning they would have to stand as an Independent in the Perak State Legislative Assembly. Perak Pakatan chairman, Ahmad Faizal Azumu, was later sworn in as the new Menteri Besar of Perak on 12 May.

On the same day, three Johor BN assemblymen announced that they had left the coalition to join PPBM. Their defection gives Pakatan a total of 39 seats, giving them a two-thirds majority in the 56-seat State Legislative Assembly. Subsequently, two Independent MPs, Lubok Antu MP, Jugah Muyang, and Julau MP, Larry Sng Wei Shien, announced that they had joined PKR. Jugah Muyang won in a three-cornered fight against both Barisan and PKR, while the latter was endorsed by Pakatan against Barisan Nasional. A third Independent MP, Prabakaran Parameswaran, who won in the constituency of Batu, announced that he had joined PKR in the day afterwards, thus increasing Pakatan's total tally in the Dewan Rakyat to 125. He was endorsed by Pakatan Harapan during the general election after the coalition's original candidate, Tian Chua, was disqualified from contesting due to a RM2,000 fine. On the following day, an Independent Perak assemblyman, Zainol Fadzi Paharudin, who was one of the two Barisan assemblymen who had their UMNO membership dropped for supporting a Pakatan government, announced that he had joined PPBM, His defection from Barisan to Pakatan increases the coalition's tally in the Perak State Legislative Assembly to 30 seats, enough to form a simple majority.

On 19 May the disputed president of the People's Progressive Party (myPPP), M. Kayveas, declared that the party had left Barisan Nasional. However, Kayveas' statement was denied by the party's deputy secretary-general, Simon Sabapathy, who insisted that the party was still part of the coalition and that Kayveas' announcement was invalid as he was no longer the president of the party, after he was supposedly sacked by the party on April. This resulted in a party leadership crisis, as the party's leadership was split between the party's former president, M. Kayveas, who's pursuing to make the party leave Barisan, and the party's current president, Maglin Dennis D'Cruz, who wants the party to remain in Barisan. Eventually, Kayveas won the struggle, and announced that myPPP had left Barisan. The party would eventually be de-registered by the Registrar of Societies in January 2019, amid the leadership dispute.

Nearly a month after the General Election, on 12 June, another four BN component parties, the United Bumiputera Heritage Party (PBB), the Sarawak People's Party (PRS), the Sarawak United People's Party (SUPP) and the Progressive Democratic Party (PDP) announced their withdrawal from Barisan Nasional and the formation of a new Sarawak-based coalition, the Gabungan Parti Sarawak (GPS). The four parties altogether had 19 seats in the Dewan Rakyat and 72 seats in the 82-seat Sarawak State Legislative Assembly, thus decreasing Barisan's seat tally even further. Two weeks later, on 24 June, the Malaysian People's Movement Party (Gerakan) became the latest party to leave Barisan Nasional.

The election resulted in a mass defection of UMNO MPs from the party, mostly becoming independents, some eventually changing their alliance and joining PH. On 24 June, the MP of Bagan Serai, Noor Azmi Ghazali, announced his withdrawal from the coalition to become an Independent Member of Parliament, and expressed interest to join the Malaysian United Indigenous Party (PPBM), a component party of Pakatan Harapan. Three days later, UMNO's Bukit Gantang MP, Syed Abu Hussin Hafiz Syed Abdul Fasal, announced his departure from the party to also become an Independent Member of Parliament. Further on 1 July, UMNO's Masjid Tanah MP, Mas Ermieyati Samsudin left the party to become an Independent Parliamentarian after disappointment with the party's election result. Two more defections occurred in the month of September. UMNO's Jeli MP, Mustapa Mohamed, left the party on 18 September, proceeded by UMNO's Kimanis MP, Anifah Aman, the day after. On 11 October, UMNO's Labuan MP, Rozman Isli, left the party and joined Warisan, citing for the benefit of Labuan. Another series of defections occurred in December. On 12 December, five Sabah UMNO MPs and nine of the state assemblypersons left the party to become independents, pledging support for Pakatan. On 14 December, six UMNO MPs, Hamzah Zainudin (Larut), Ikmal Hisham Abdul Aziz (Tanah Merah), Abdul Latiff Ahmad (Mersing), Rosol Wahid (Hulu Terengganu), Mohd Fasiah Mohd Fakeh (Sabak Bernam) and Shabudin Yahaya (Tasik Gelugor) altogether left the party due to disappointment with UMNO's current leadership. The series of defections and parties withdrawing from Barisan Nasional leaves the coalition with only three component parties, UMNO, MCA and MIC (the original three parties that formed the Alliance Party), a decrease of ten parties from the 13 they had prior to the election, and 40 seats, a substantial decrease from the 79 seats they won in the election, with the formations of Sarawak-based GPS in 2018 and Sabah-based GRS in 2020, separately governing both states.

Party leadership changes 
After facing a defeat in the election, losing nearly a third of its seats in the Dewan Rakyat, former Prime Minister Najib Razak announced his resignation as president of UMNO and chairman of Barisan Nasional on 12 May. Party deputy president Ahmad Zahid Hamidi took over the role as  acting president of UMNO and chairman of Barisan Nasional, while vice-president Hishammuddin Hussein took over the duties of acting deputy president and deputy chairman of Barisan. Najib's resignation resulted in a party leadership election, in which seven candidates eyed to become the party's new president. The result was that Zahid won the party leadership elections. He and former Negeri Sembilan Menteri Besar Mohamad Hasan are now president and vice president of UMNO respectively.

2020 political crisis 

PH government, however, served just 22 months before the take over of administration by PN, led by Muhyiddin Yassin, who was sworned in as the 8th Prime Minister on 1 March 2020. This came after PH lost its majority in the Dewan Rakyat following the withdrawal of Muhyiddin's party PPBM from PH, as well as defection of MPs led by Azmin Ali from PKR. Change in government of states of Johor, Malacca and Perak, followed suit. Kedah, on the other hand, is still governed by PH in spite of PPBM's withdrawal from PH until 17 May 2020 when PN took over of state government.

Popular culture
 Rise: Ini Kalilah was a 2018 Malaysian political drama film based on the actual events on 9 May 2018 in the aftermath of the 14th General Election.
 The election is also the subject of the 2019 documentary film M for Malaysia.

Notes

See also 

List of candidates in the 2018 Malaysian general election
List of Malaysian electoral districts
2018 Malaysian state elections
1Malaysia Development Berhad scandal

Further reading
 Lynette H. Ong. 2021. The Street and the Ballot Box: Interactions Between Social Movements and Electoral Politics in Authoritarian Contexts. Cambridge University press
Kai Ostwald & Steven Olive. 2020. "Four arenas: Malaysia’s 2018 election, reform, and democratization." Democratization.
Sebastian Dettman (2020) Authoritarian innovations and democratic reform in the “New Malaysia”, Democratization.

Notes

References

External links

Official websites 
 Electoral Commission of Malaysia
 General Election 14th website
 Voters' website
 Candidates' website

Other websites 
 Merdeka Center: Poll Report
 Malaysia Memilih 2018
 The Straits Times: Full Results 2018

Manifestos 
 BN: Download
 PH: Download 
 GS: Download 

 
Malaysia
General elections in Malaysia
General